The 2016 FIFA Club World Cup final was the final match of the 2016 FIFA Club World Cup, an association football tournament hosted by Japan. It was the 13th final of the FIFA Club World Cup, a FIFA-organised tournament between the winners of the six continental confederations, as well as the host nation's league champions.

The final was contested between Spanish club Real Madrid, representing UEFA as the reigning champions of the UEFA Champions League, and Japanese club Kashima Antlers, representing the host country as the reigning champions of the J1 League. It was the first time a team from Asia played in the final. The match was played at the International Stadium Yokohama in Yokohama on 18 December 2016.

Real Madrid won the match 4–2 after extra time to claim their 2nd title.

Background
Kashima Antlers became the first Asian club to reach the FIFA Club World Cup final. It was also the first time that an Asian club won against a South American side in the history of the competition, and the third time that South American champions failed to qualify for the final, after the 2010 and 2013 editions.

For Real Madrid, the match was their second final, after having won the 2014 final. This was the 12th time in 13 tournaments in which a European team made it to the final.

Route to the final

Real Madrid
Real Madrid entered the competition in the semi-finals, facing Mexican side and CONCACAF Champions League winners América. Karim Benzema opened the scoring for Real in first half stoppage time, putting them ahead at the break. Cristiano Ronaldo secured the 2–0 victory and final spot for Los Blancos with a goal in second half stoppage time.

Kashima Antlers
Kashima Antlers started the tournament in the quarter-final play-off, facing New Zealand side Auckland City, winners of the OFC Champions League. Auckland opened the scoring via a goal from Kim Dae-wook in the 50th minute. Seventeen minutes later, Shuhei Akasaki equalised for the hosts. With two minutes remaining, Mu Kanazaki grabbed the late winner, sending Kashima through to the quarter-finals with a 2–1 win.

In the quarter-finals, the Antlers faced the CAF Champions League winners and South African champions Mamelodi Sundowns. Yasushi Endo opened the scoring in the 63rd minute to put Kashima ahead, before Shuhei Akasaki once again scored with two minutes remaining to secure the 2–0 win and semi-final spot.

In the semi-finals, Kashima met the Copa Libertadores winners, Atlético Nacional of Colombia. In the 33rd minute, Hungarian referee Viktor Kassai awarded a historic penalty to Kashima. This was the first time that the video assistant referee (VAR) system was used to award a penalty in football, following a video replay review by Kassai. The review was initiated after Kassai received information from Dutchman Danny Makkelie about a missed incident in Atlético Nacional's penalty box. Shoma Doi then successfully converted the penalty to put Kashima ahead at the interval. Yasushi Endo extended their lead in the 83rd minute, before Yuma Suzuki scored two minutes later, wrapping up the 3–0 win for Kashima and sending them through to the final.

Match

Summary
Real Madrid centre-forward Karim Benzema opened the scoring in the ninth minute with a right foot shot from seven yards out after an initial shot from Luka Modrić was saved by Hitoshi Sogahata with the rebound coming straight back to Benzema. Gaku Shibasaki equalised for Kashima Antlers shortly before the interval with a low left footed shot from six yards out to the right corner of the net. In the 52nd minute, Shibasaki scored his second to put Kashima ahead with a low left foot shot from outside the penalty box that skimmed past Real goalkeeper Keylor Navas and into the left corner of the net. In the sixtieth minute, Antlers defender Shuto Yamamoto fouled Real forward Lucas Vázquez in the box, resulting in a penalty awarded to Madrid. Forward Cristiano Ronaldo converted the spot kick shooting low to his left to equalise for the European champions. Both sides had additional opportunities to score, but with no further goals in regulation, the match went to extra time.

In the 98th minute, Ronaldo scored his second goal of the match to put Real Madrid ahead once again with a low left-footed shot from inside the penalty box which went under the goalkeeper, following a through ball by Benzema. In the final minute of the first half of extra time, Ronaldo completed his hat-trick for Real Madrid with a left-footed shot from the center of the box into the roof of the net, following a pass from Toni Kroos. The hat-trick goal sealed the 4–2 win for Real, giving them their second Club World Cup title in three years.

Details

Statistics

Post-match

The win gave Real their second Club World title, after winning the 2014 edition. The title was Real's third of 2016, following victories in the 2015–16 UEFA Champions League and 2016 UEFA Super Cup. With his final hat-trick, Cristiano Ronaldo was named the man of the match. He also finished as the tournament's top scorer, with four goals. Additionally, he was awarded the adidas Golden Ball for best player of the tournament. Teammate Luka Modrić came in second, receiving the Silver Ball. Kashima midfielder Gaku Shibasaki came in third, and was given the Bronze Ball following his brace in the final. Kashima Antlers were also awarded the fair play award with the best fair play record during the tournament.

Following the match, Real manager Zinedine Zidane commented on the victory, saying: "We knew that this final would not be an easy one. They ran. They fought. I think there are several players from Kashima that could play in La Liga. The fact that we were able to be here and win, we're very happy. To be able to take the Club World Cup back home with us makes us very happy." Kashima manager Masatada Ishii stated that "For us to be able to come so far is meaningful. It really means that Japanese football, in a very short period of time, has come up to a world-class level."

See also
Real Madrid CF in international football competitions

References

External links
FIFA Club World Cup Japan 2016, FIFA.com
Photos
Match highlights
MatchCast

Final
2016
Real Madrid CF matches
Kashima Antlers matches
2016–17 in Spanish football
FIFA
Sports competitions in Yokohama
2010s in Yokohama